Rappi is a delivery and commerce company headquartered in Bogotá, Colombia, and with main offices in São Paulo, Mexico City and the US. It was founded in 2015 by Simón Borrero, Sebastian Mejía, and Felipe Villamarín.

History 
Rappi was founded in 2015 by three Colombian entrepreneurs: Simón Borrero, Felipe Villamarin and Sebastián Mejía. 

Rappi entered Y Combinator's Winter 2016 batch, generating additional investment. In August 2018, the company raised another $200 million in funding. SoftBank became a major stakeholder in Rappi in April 2019 with a $1 billion investment that valued Rappi at $3.5 billion.

In January 2019, Borrero, Villamarin, and Mejía were listed as part of Bloomberg’s 50 Most Influential people and Rappi was highlighted as a company that is “transforming Latin America”.

In February 2019, Simon Borrero was awarded the "Empresario del año" (Businessman of the year) award from the Colombian President. Simon Borrero and Rappi are currently being sued in U.S. federal court for misappropriation of trade secrets.

As of August 2020, Rappi had more than 200,000 independent couriers actively connecting to the app in Latin America. Rappi also worked with over 250,000 different businesses including groceries shops, pharmacies, kiosks, and office supply stores.

In 2021, Rappi was valued at $5.25 billion following their $500 million Series F financing round.

Rappi Bank
In March 2019, Rappi partnered with Visa Inc. to offer prepaid cards in Mexico, Colombia and Brazil, together with a QR-Code based digital wallet called RappiPay. In Colombia, they reached an alliance with Davivienda as well.  Rappi's Country Manager in Brazil said it was the first of many financial services the company planned to expand beyond delivery.

In 2021, RappiBank launched in Mexico as a fintech solution made after an alliance with Banorte, providing digital financial services.

In 2022, Rappi got approval to become a bank in Colombia. Rappi offers working capital credit lines to restaurant owners and merchants it partners with. In Colombia, RappiPay has around 750,000 users, distributed more than 120,000 credit cards, and made an alliance with Davivienda.

In 2022, as part of the portfolio of Financial Services, Rappi announced the launching of payments using Crypto.

Controversies and legal trouble

Legal trouble 

In September 2019, Rappi CEO and co-founder Simón Borrero has been accused of stealing the company Uribe's "idea for the creation of a platform that allowed users to contact other people willing to run errands." The Colombian Superintendency of Industry and Commerce has ordered the company to comply with electronic commerce regulations, however it allegedly still operates outside of these regulations. The company currently has 108 active lawsuits related to consumer protection lodged against it.

The Colombian Superintendency of Industry and Commerce is currently claiming that plaintiff Rappi is "Not having a complaints channel for their customers, the fact that there is still confusion in the terms and conditions ... the final price for the consumer still being unknown and variable, the fact they are still not giving full attention to the complaints ... calls our attention," Superintendency head Andres Barreto told journalists.

Along with a myriad of predatory employment policies, it has been discovered Rappi intended to force employees to compete for access to COVID-19 vaccinations.

Work conditions 
In October 2018, some delivery couriers of Rappi took to the streets. The company has been criticized for its working conditions, from the employee side and for a lack of customer care from their clientele. Rappi has allegedly failed to follow regulations regarding customer support and faces possible fines from government regulators.

See also
 Visa Inc.
 Davivienda
 Banorte
MercadoLibre

References

External links 
 

Colombian brands
Companies based in Bogotá
Freelance marketplace websites
Retail companies established in 2015
Transport companies established in 2015
Internet properties established in 2015
Online retailers of Colombia
Online food ordering